Topraqlu (also Romanized as Toprāqlū; also known as Tūprāqlū and Tūryākhlū) is a village in Sharqi Rural District, in the Central District of Ardabil County, Ardabil Province, Iran. At the 2006 census, its population was 888, in 189 families.

References 

Towns and villages in Ardabil County